The Pukbunaeryuk Line, also called the Hyesan–Manp'o Ch'ŏngnyŏn Line after the only completed stage of three planned stages, is an electrified standard-gauge secondary trunk line of the Korean State Railway in Chagang and Ryanggang Provinces, North Korea, connecting the Manp'o Line at Manp'o to the Paektusan Ch'ŏngnyŏn Line at Hyesan. It also connects to the China Railway Meiji Railway via the Ji'an Yalu River Border Railway Bridge between Manp'o and Meihekou, China.

There are 42 stations on the line, of which Chasŏng, Hwap'yŏng, P'op'yŏng Ch'ŏngnyŏn, and Mint'ang are dedicated freight consolidation points; the stations of Chŏnp'yŏng, Tuji, Sinp'a Ch'ŏngnyŏn, Ryanggang Sinsang, and Insan are served only by passenger trains.

There are locomotive facilities at Manp'o and Hyesan, and formerly at P'op'yŏng; Hyesan also has shops for maintenance of passenger and freight cars.

History
Having been the only major east-west trunk line at the time, the P'yŏngra Line had become overly congested by the 1970s, as all east-west traffic - even that moving between the northwest and the northeast - had to travel via the P'yŏngra Line. To alleviate the burden, President Kim Il-sung ordered the construction of a new, northern east-west transversal line in August 1980. This line, which was to have made use of parts of existing lines where possible, in addition to newly built trackage, was to have connected Manp'o in the west with Hoeryŏng in the east. This would have resulted in the creation of a direct connections between the Manp'o Line in the northwest and the Hambuk Line in the northeast of the country, allowing traffic between these two areas to avoid the P'yŏngra Line. This would also have significantly shortened the travelled distances.

The Pukbunaeryuk Line, as the planned line was called (북부, pukpu, means "northern"), was to have been built in three stages: Manp'o to Hyesan, Hyesan to Musan, and Musan to Hoeryŏng.

Stage 1: Hyesan–Manp'o
In 1959, the Korean State Railway opened the Unbong Line, a  line from Manp'o to Unbong, to assist with the construction of the Unbong Dam on the Yalu River which had begun in October of that year. The first stage of the northern trunk line, from Manp'o to Hyesan, made use of the entirety of the Unbong Line. A new passenger-friendly station was built at Unbong, called Sinunbong Station (="New Unbong Station") (the previous Unbong Station, which had been the terminus of the Unbong Line and, after the construction of the new line, became the terminus of the truncated Unbong Line, was later renamed Kuunbong Station - that is, "Old Unbong Station", and Sinunbong Station became simply Unbong Station).

Stage 2: Hyesan–Musan
The line was to have shared the track of the Paektusan Ch'ŏngnyŏn Line from Hyesan to Wiyŏn; from there, the Wiyŏn–Karim section of the narrow-gauge Samjiyŏn Line and the Karim–Poch'ŏn section of the Poch'ŏn Line were to have been converted to standard gauge; from Poch'ŏn a new line would have been built to Rimyŏngsu, and from there, the Rimyŏngsu–Samjiyŏn–Motka section of narrow-gauge line was to have been regauged. From Samjiyŏn there was to be a new line built via Taehongdan town, Nongsa-rodongjagu, and Samjang-rodongjagu to Hŭngam on the Paengmu Line, from where the existing narrow-gauge line to Musan was to have been regauged.

Stage 3: Musan–Hoeryŏng
The third stage of the Pukbunaeryuk Line project was to have been the construction of a new  line from Musan to Hoeryŏng on the Hambuk Line. From Musan, the line was to have run through Musan County along the Tumen River via Ch'ilsŏng-ri and Saegŏl-li, continuing from there along a newly built line to Yusŏn, the terminus of the Hoeryŏng Colliery Line; this line would have been absorbed into the Pukpu Line.

Present
The first stage had been completed at the end of 1988; by then, some works had begun on the second stage, but due to the DPRK's economic crisis of the 1990s, construction was eventually abandoned. Electrification of the existing portion of the line was begun in 1991 with the goal of completing it in time for Kim Il-sung's 80th birthday on 15 April 1992; however, it wasn't until 1993 that the electrification of the entire Manp'o–Hyesan line was completed.

By the end of the 2000s, the line was in such poor condition that the operation of trains was nearly impossible; citing this, in April 2011 Kim Jong-il once again mobilised work brigades of the Kim Il-sung Socialist Youth League to undertake the reconstruction of the line; the refurbishment work was completed in November 2013.

Services

It is one of the lightest-travelled of all trunk lines in the DPRK. There are a number of passenger trains on the line, including commuter trains serving Rimt'o. Most of the freight traffic on the line is military, but logs are also transported along the line from the Kamae Plateau. Ore from the March 5 Youth Mine is delivered to Chasŏng Station for loading onto trains by means of a ropeway conveyor.

Route
A yellow background in the "Distance" box indicates that section of the line is not electrified.

References

Railway lines in North Korea
Standard gauge railways in North Korea